Lifted Off the Ground is the seventh studio album from singer-songwriter Chely Wright. The album was released on April 30, 2010 and coincided with the release of her first memoir, Like Me: Confessions of a Heartland Country Singer. Within two weeks of the album's release, it was estimated to have sold nearly 6,000 copies.

Background
After nearly a two-year hiatus, Wright resurfaced through social networking sites including MySpace, Facebook and YouTube. Wright would create general blog entries about her life, touring and other miscellaneous events. In September 2007, she announced she was working on her next studio album with country singer Rodney Crowell. As time progressed, Wright would update viewers on the status of the album. Originally, the album was titled "Notes to the Coroner" with a released date in the fall of 2008. Wright's official website highlight tracks such as, "Broken", "Wish Me Away", "Object of Your Rejection", "Damn Liar" and "Notes to the Coroner".

During this time, Wright's record company wanted her to write happier songs, stating her songs about failed relationships were too dark and depressing. Wright was told to write something "positive and hopeful". She responded with the song "Something Positive and Hopeful", a satirical look on her past relationships set to a happy tune that her record company requested. The song was performed at fan gala in Nashville where Wright jokingly mentioned she hoped the song would be included on her album. Wright eventually placed the album on hold to focus on writing more songs. In January 2010, it was revealed her album would be released in May 2010 along with a memoir.

Promotion
Promotion for the album began with Wright appearing in People revealing her homosexuality. Since the announcement, Wright has appeared on the Today Show, NPR, Access Hollywood, The Joy Behar Show, Rosie Radio, Good Day L.A., ABC World News and The Oprah Winfrey Show. She was featured in MTV News, Edge, Entertainment Weekly and The Advocate. Wright went on a book signing and concert tour to promote the album.

Reception

The album received several positive reviews.  Thom Jurek (AllMusic) stated the album was, "[…] is easily the most harrowing and lovely recording in Wrights catalog". Blake Boldt (Engine 145) cites the album is "[…] a more complex, complete album then she's ever record, Wright has, for once, found some release".

Amongst the many positive reviews there were a few mixed or negative reviews. Stormy Lewis (Roughstock) states, "Lifted off the Ground is neither as cohesive nor expressive as [Single White Female] was.  It does however, have moments of nearly pure bliss.  What you will not find on this album is an “Unknown” or “She Went out for Cigarettes.”  What you will find on this album is the next best things.  And, for some songs, that is almost good enough." Margaret Wappler (The L.A. Times) writes, […]But where's the teeth? Sure, she sounds mad on 'Damn Liar' but as far as making statements about her 'lifestyle,' in a genre often defined by traditional notions of sexuality and family, Wright treads lightly."

Track listing

Personnel 
 Rodney Crowell – acoustic guitar, background vocals
 Micol Davis – background vocals
 John Ferraro – drums
 Tanya Hancheroff – background vocals
 John Hobbs – keyboards, organ
 Jedd Hughes – acoustic guitar, electric slide guitar
 John Jorgenson – acoustic guitar, electric guitar, gut string guitar, mandolin, piano
 Will Kimbrough – acoustic guitar, acoustic slide guitar
 Tim Lauer – electric piano, keyboards, organ, piano, pump organ
 Jeremy Lister – background vocals
 Chris McHugh – drums
 Michael Rhodes – bass
 Chris Rodriguez – acoustic guitar, background vocals
 Randy Scruggs – acoustic guitar
 Kenny Vaughan – acoustic guitar, electric guitar
 Cheryl White – background vocals
 Chely Wright – acoustic guitar, lead vocals
 Jonathan Yudkin – cello, violin, viola

Chart History

Release history

References

2010 albums
Chely Wright albums
Vanguard Records albums
Albums produced by Rodney Crowell